Sathamanam Bhavati is a 2017 Indian Telugu-language drama film written and directed by Satish Vegesna. The film is produced by Dil Raju under Sri Venkateswara Creations and stars Sharwanand, Anupama Parameswaran, Prakash Raj and Jayasudha in key roles. An ensemble cast including Naresh, Indraja, Raja Ravindra, Shiju, Himaja, and Sithara plays supporting roles. Sathamanam Bhavati deals with the themes of  "tradition-technology conflict", "joint family vs nuclear family", and "midlife crisis".

The score and soundtrack are composed by Mickey J. Meyer, and cinematography is by Sameer Reddy. The film released worldwide on 14 January 2017 with highly positive reviews and coinciding with Sankranthi. The screenplay of the film was archived at the Oscar Library. The film has received the Best Popular Film Providing Wholesome Entertainment at the 64th National Film Awards "in appreciation of providing a feeling of jubilation by respecting family values in an unexplored manner". The film has also garnered the Andhra Pradesh state Nandi Award for Best Direction, and Best Home Viewing Feature Film.

Plot

Raghavaraju is a farming landlord in Atreyapuram village of Andhra Pradesh. He lives with his wife Janakamma, along with his nephew Bangararaju, his wife and their son Raju. Raghavaraju lives in his ancestral house built by his forefathers consisting of many generations living in the same household as a joint family. However, with changing times, Ragahvaraju's two sons, Ravi and Kalyan and daughter Jhansi live in the United States, Canada, and Australia respectively as nuclear families. After a gap of 10 years, all of his children arrive in the village during the holiday season of Makara Sankranti, under mysterious circumstances after they receive an email from Raghavaraju, who expresses his wish to divorce his wife.

Nithya is the daughter of Jhansi. Soon Nithya and Raju fall in love but do not express it to each other. The siblings soon reunite. Raju and Nithya set up a meeting of their uncle with his old love interest. However, Jhansi asks Raju to not to keep up his hopes on Nithya's love, which he does but which leaves Nithya heartbroken.

Raghavaraju and Janakamma reveal that they are not going to divorce but getting separated from each other, while Janakamma wants to live with her children. Raghavaraju wants to see her wife happy, so he emails his children so that they can come home and take their mother with them. Raju sent the divorce papers to a lawyer to make them understand the value of family. After Raghavaraju's words, they felt sorry for avoiding their parents. Jhansi accepts Nithya and Raju's marriage and their marriage was accepted by the whole family. All of them celebrate Sankranthi and promise to come back for celebrating Ugadi with their family, while Nithya expresses her wish to stay with her grandparents, Raju and his parents.

Cast

Production

Development 
The idea of Shatamanam Bhavati originated in 1990s. Director Sathish Vegesna wrote a short story Palle Payanam Etu?, which was written as part of a single-page short story competition conducted by Andhra Prabha. The story was then rejected and not published. Later, in early 2015, Vegesna decided to make a feature film based on the same story.

Casting 
In September 2015, Sai Dharam Tej has signed two projects for Dil Raju under Sri Venkateswara Creations, which were Supreme directed by Anil Ravipudi and Sathamanam Bhavati by Satish Vegesna. In February 2016, Sai Dharam Tej has opted out due to schedule conflicts and replaced by Raj Tarun alongside Anupama Parameswaran. Later in May 2016, Raj Tarun was replaced by Sharwanand as lead in the film. After performing well in two Telugu films Premam (2016) and A Aa (2016), Anupama was cast to play the role Nithya, an NRI from Australia.

Filming 
The film was officially launched on 27 August 2016 and muhurtam shot was also done. The principal photography of the film began in Amalapuram, Andhra Pradesh in September 2016. completed by. Few scenes were filmed at Thalluru, nearby Rajahmundry. Filming was wrapped up on 28 November 2016 within 49 days.

Soundtrack

Music is composed by Mickey J. Meyer. The album was released by Aditya Music company.

Home media 
The film was dubbed in Hindi as S/O Krishnamurthy and released by Aditya Movies in September 2019. It was also dubbed in Tamil under the same name. The television broadcast rights of the film were acquired by Zee Telugu. The film was premiered on 26 March 2017 and registered a TRP rating of 15.4. Later it was made available on ZEE5.

Reception

Box office 
Made on budget of ₹8 crore, the film collected a gross of ₹10.70 crore and distributor's share of ₹6 crore in its opening week. Mint reported that the film collected a gross of $653,664 (₹4.45 crore) in the United States in the first two weeks since its release. The film was exhibited for 100 days in few movie theaters across the Telugu states. In late April 2017, a success meet was held for the film's 100 days theatrical run.

Critical response 
Upon release, the film received positive reviews from critics. Various critics praised Vegesna's screenplay. Srividya Palaparthi of The Times of India gave the film three stars out of five and commented, "Shatamanam Bhavathi doesn’t offer much as a film. However, this is the holiday season, and if you wanted watch a laid-back low-risk film with your family, there couldn’t be a better choice." and also praised cinematography done by Sameer Reddy. The Hindu's Srivathsan Nadadhur quoted the film as "rightly peppered for the festive season" and "an ideal family watch". He further added that the film gets its balance right predominantly due to the performances, humour and Mickey J. Meyer's music.

Writing for Deccan Chronicle, Pranita Jonnalagedda gave mixed review about the film and felt that the music compositions by Mickey J. Meyer have similarities with other films like Brahmotsavam, Seethamma Vakitlo Sirimalle Chettu and A Aa. She also criticized of the predictability of most of the scenes in the film. Jeevi of Idlebrain praised the dialogues written Vegesna's which explored morals and relationships. On a whole, he wrote that "Shatamanam Bhavati has elements and intent that attract family crowds this festival season."

Legacy 
Following the success of the film, Vegesna further directed two family drama films Srinivasa Kalyanam (2018) and Entha Manchivaadavuraa (2020). Both films have similar plot, focusing more on "tradition-technology conflict", "joint family vs nuclear family" and "age-old wedding traditions".

Sangeetha Devi Dundoo of The Hindu listed Sathamanam Bhavati among "Top 10 Telugu films of 2017". It was also featured on The Indian Express's "2017’s best Telugu films" article, written by Manoj Kumar R.

Accolades

Notes

See also  
 Ammammagarillu
 Prati Roju Pandage

References

External links

2017 films
2017 drama films
2010s Telugu-language films
Films shot in Andhra Pradesh
Films set in Andhra Pradesh
Midlife crisis films
Films scored by Mickey J Meyer
Indian family films
Indian drama films
Best Popular Film Providing Wholesome Entertainment National Film Award winners
Films shot in Rajahmundry
Films about social issues in India
Films set in Konaseema